Alfie Conn may refer to:
Alfie Conn, Sr., Scottish international footballer, most famous for his time with Heart of Midlothian, played 1944–1960
Alfie Conn, Jr., his son, also a Scottish international footballer, whose former teams include Rangers, Tottenham Hotspur and Celtic, played 1968–1983